Florence Mary Wilson may refer to:

 Florence Austral (1892–1968), Australian operatic soprano, born Florence Mary Wilson
 Florence Mary Wilson (writer) (1870–1946), poet